Inara Maryland George (born July 4, 1974) is an American singer-songwriter and musician, one half of The Bird and the Bee, a member of the band Merrick, with Bryony Atkinson, and a member of the trio The Living Sisters, with Eleni Mandell and Becky Stark.

Early life
George was born in Towson, Maryland. She is the daughter of Lowell George, the late founder of the rock and roll group Little Feat, and Elizabeth George. Jackson Browne wrote the song "Of Missing Persons" for Inara George after the death of her father, who died just before her fifth birthday. She has three half brothers named Luke, Forrest and Jed.

George was involved with theatre at a young age, especially Shakespeare, in Topanga Canyon, a community in the Santa Monica mountains. She later relocated to Boston, Massachusetts to study acting in the classical theater tradition.

Career
While visiting home one summer, George and several high-school friends launched a band named Lode. To their surprise, the bandmates landed a deal with Geffen Records and released the 1996 album Legs & Arms. Later, George joined Bryony Atkinson to form Merrick, an indie rock duo that released two albums before disbanding in 2002.

Three years later, George struck out on her own by issuing her solo debut All Rise on Everloving Records.  All Rise was produced by Michael Andrews (Donnie Darko, Freaks and Geeks) and featured musical contributions from Greg Kurstin. The two formed the Bird and the Bee and released a self-titled album in 2006, followed by several EPs. While preparing for the duo's second full-length release, George also found time to return to her own project, teaming up with veteran producer and family friend Van Dyke Parks for 2008's An Invitation.

Personal life
George is married to director Jake Kasdan, with whom she has three children, including twins.

Discography

Solo
 2005: All Rise (Everloving)
 2008: An Invitation (with Van Dyke Parks) (Everloving)
 2009: Accidental Experimental(Everloving)
 2018: Dearest Everybody

with The Bird and the Bee
 2006: Again and Again and Again and Again
 2007: The Bird and the Bee
 2007: Please Clap Your Hands
 2008: One Too Many Hearts
 2009: Ray Guns Are Not Just the Future
 2010: Interpreting the Masters Volume 1: A Tribute to Daryl Hall and John Oates
 2015: Recreational Love
 2019: Interpreting the Masters, Volume 2: A Tribute to Van Halen
 2020: Put Up the Lights

with The Living Sisters
 2010: Love To Live
 2013: Run for Cover
 2014: Harmony is Real: Songs for a Happy Holiday

with Lode
 1996: Legs & Arms

with Merrick
 2001: Merrick
 2001: Drive Around a Lot Hard and Fast Driving Club

Soundtracks
 1999: The Minus Man (Music from the Shooting Gallery Motion Picture)
 2012: Harem (Songs from the Movie That's What She Said)

Other appearances
 1997: Trouble from the 'Rock and Roll Doctor' tribute to Lowell George
 2002: I'll Watch Your Life to See – Wendel
 2005: Warnings/Promises – Idlewild
 2005: Just Before Dark – Mike Viola
 2006: Immune to Gravity – MOTH
 2007: Make Another World – Idlewild
 2008: Join the Band – Little Feat
 2009: Dark Touches – Har Mar Superstar
 2009: I Told You I Was Freaky – Flight of the Conchords
 2009: "He Needs Me" – Documentary "All You Need Is Klaus", Voormann & Friends – A Sideman's Journey
 2011: Penny Loafers from Daedelus album Bespoke
 2012: Love is a Four Letter Word – Jason Mraz
 2017: Concrete and Gold – Foo Fighters
 2017: Future Friends – Superfruit
 2018: How High (single) – Kneebody
 2020: I’ll Be Your Sunny Day on The Tango Bar – Greg Copeland

References

External links

 Inara George's Official Site
 Sirens of Song: Inara George
 July 2008 Interview with L.A. Record
 Interview with Sound Bites Dog E-Zine

1974 births
Living people
American women guitarists
American women singer-songwriters
American women pop singers
American women rock singers
American rock songwriters
Women bass guitarists
Singer-songwriters from California
Guitarists from Los Angeles
21st-century American women singers
21st-century American bass guitarists
Label Bleu artists
21st-century American singers
The Bird and the Bee members
The Living Sisters members